SUNAB, Svenska UMTS-nät AB, is a company jointly owned by Tele2 Sverige AB and Telia Company AB for the purpose of building, owning and operating a 3G network for the parent companies. SUNAB was formed in 2001.

The joint network operated by SUNAB is the largest 3G network in Sweden, both by coverage and customer base.

SUNAB is operated as a multi-operator core network (MOCN) and was one of the first in the world.

See also
 Telecom infrastructure sharing

References

Telecommunications companies of Sweden